Manuel María Eutimio de Zamacona y Murphy (13 September 1826 – 29 May 1904) was a Mexican radical liberal lawyer, journalist, and politician. Born in Puebla, he studied at seminary and went on to practice law. As a journalist he founded El Siglo XIX, an influential newspaper founded in 1852. He served as minister of Foreign Affairs in the cabinet of President Benito Juárez (1861). He negotiated an agreement with the British Ambassador to Mexico, Charles Wyke, known as the Wyke-Zamacona Treaty, which sought an interim solution of the Juárez government's problems concerning the external debt to Great Britain, France, and Spain. When Juárez decided to suspend payments on the foreign debt in July 1861, he risked foreign intervention. The treaty was aimed at forestalling that, but it was rejected by the Mexican congress. With that rejection, Zamacona resigned from Juárez's government and went on to lead the liberal opposition to Juárez. He negotiated diplomatic recognition to the administration of President Porfirio Díaz from the government of the United States (1878) and presided over the Supreme Court of Justice.

Notes and references

1826 births
1904 deaths
Politicians from Puebla
Mexican Secretaries of Foreign Affairs
Ambassadors of Mexico to the United States
Presidents of the Supreme Court of Justice of the Nation
Presidents of the Chamber of Deputies (Mexico)
Members of the Chamber of Deputies (Mexico)
People from Puebla (city)
Liberalism in Mexico
Second French intervention in Mexico